The gardens of the rotonda is a terraced garden, situated close to the historical centre of Padua, behind the sixteenth century wall and the Rampart of the Cat.

History

The name is connected to an episode which occurred during the 1509 siege by the German King Maximilian I during the War of the League of Cambrai. According to legend, a cat was flayed alive to frighten the enemy with its screams. A sculpture of a cat jutting out of a niche was placed on the outer part of the tower facing Codalunga Street in order to commemorate this event, as well as symbolize the freedom of the people of Padua.

The garden is so called because it was planned around the area where a monumental suspended tank with a circular shaped base was built.
It is the first water tank to be built in Padua, a prestigious work of engineering dating back to the 1920s. It can hold 200 cubic metres (44,000 gallons) of water and was considered not only the best aqueduct in Italy but also one of the best water tanks in Europe.

It is also remarkable as regards the construction materials since it is one of the earliest examples of the use of concrete in Padua. The decision to build the water tank and Codalunga water power plant just on this spot was due to the following events:
On 11 November an Austrian bomb exploded killing 96 inhabitants who had hidden inside the gunners which were considered safe shelters.
On 29 October a bomb, dropped from a plane in 1918 but unexploded until then, went off and destroyed the electric power plant causing serious water supply problems to the city.

Description of the garden
The space between the water reservoir and the wall was used for a public garden, inaugurated in 1925 and named della Rotonda. To enter the garden one cross a stepped path starting from Vicolo Mazzini and continuing parallel to Viale della Rotonda. The path is characterized by five balconies with a circular fountain in the centre and each balcony is framed by a simple ring of grass. The presence of many fountains is due to the presence of the water reservoir. In every fountain there are many water-lilies which fill the visitors with a sense of pleasure and serenity.

Every terrace is separated from the next by gardens and gravel paths shaped like a circular geometric garden with an axis perpendicular to the water reservoir. The style of the Rotonda Garden is a mixture of Liberty and Classicism but it also presents features of the 20th century. The architectural style recalls the late baroque, but it is also rich in classical references, for example the flower urns and the tower mausoleum are carried out with a secessionist taste, while the shape of the flower beds, (round elliptic and drop-like), are typically liberty. In the flower beds are low bushes that are reminiscent of palms and agaves. At first the garden was apparently meant to hold few shrubby plants to be exposed to the light so as to put the main elements in contact with the water of the garden.
At present the garden is being neglected and the trees that live here have no intrinsic value. These trees represent a serious problem for the masonry banks because their roots push on them.  
The main entrance is characterized by an imposing wrought-iron railing in liberty style. The garden has and overturned- L-shape which proceeds long and narrow in the balcony and terraces and widens at the end of these, where the water reservoir is situated. On it there are geometric elements in the lower part, floral decorations in the central park and Padua coat of arms in the upper part.

At the bottom of the garden there is the stately water reservoir; its main fountain, which has a temple form, is close to a strong terraced wall structure. Inside there are some circular pilasters connected to each other by means of perimeterl and radial concrete arches, disposed on two overlapping floors because they have to support the suspended water reservoir properly.

The story of the aqueduct started on 26 August 1875, when the Mayor said
“water is so vital to man and society, like air and light, that an abundance of water distribution and a regular distribution to the whole city, deserve to be fully kept alive in the citizens’ memories”.

Following study, water from the Brenta and Bacchiglione rivers was excluded owing to their torpidity and bacterial counts, instead water of Dueville source was chosen. On 17 February 1886, the Padua town hall granted the management of the new aqueduct to Società Veneta per Imprese and Costruzioni Pubbliche. On 13 1888 in Unità d’ Italia Square, the much expected event took place: in front of an exulting crowd of Paduans the first pure water flow was raised. The reservoir, however, did not slacken the use of wells by Paduans, who avoided the costly aqueduct water. This bankrupted the Società Veneta administration. Accordingly, the commune, in 1892, decided to manage the service on its own through a special town hall authority.

This office ceased its activity in 1904 when the town hall administration decided to combine the water and the gas service. Two Municipal Companies were set up and these merged into one in 1984, when the AMAG or Azienda Municipalizzata Acqua-Gas of Padua was established.

The reservoir

Construction of the "Rotonda" building, located at the corner of Via Citolo da Perugina, was begun on 21 September 1923. It was planned for dual functions: first as an elevated  water tank and second, as to house in its base a chapel commemorating certain refugees killed in the recent world war. Its round shape resembles the Ancient Roman Tomb of Caecilia Metella in Rome.

Around the base is an inscription recalling the event:
“ SANGUINEM OLIM ATROCITER EFFUSUM AQUA PIE DEFLUENS LAVET MOLES IN CAELUM PROFERAT PERPETUO”.

On the reservoir, there is also the tombstone of Mr Andrea Moschetti, with the following inscription:
“Il martirio di 93 innocenti (....) salga a Dio olocausto perenne di futura grandezza alla patria di un nuovo patto d’amore tra i popoli”, it can be translated as: “May the torture of 93 innocent persons reach God as eternal holocaust and a new pact of love among the peoples.”

The reservoir aimed mainly to increase the daytime water availability by collecting it during the night. While its external shape recalls an ancient Roman mausoleum, the inside was technically innovating for its days. The essential lines that show the main structures, are so modern that it seems as if they are drawing the route of the water while falling down to the ground floor and into the earth.

The aqueduct
According to the increasing need of water during the time period up to Second World War, water had been taken from the water-layer of the town of Dueville.

After the war, this system was not efficient enough anymore, and the lack of water became a serious problem. Consequently, studies and projects to sort out this matter became more intensive, and from the year 1955 the Town Hall Council of Padua decreed to devise the construction of the “New Aqueduct”.

The most important action was building a second water-supplier called the “900 metres Conveyance”; whose construction was ended in 1961.

In the meantime, in order to cope with water emergency situations an auxiliary aqueduct was also built; it consisted in a system for purifying the superficial water of the river Brentella, which partially overcame the shortage of water complained by the citizens.
Afterwards relevant actions were taken in order to improve the efficiency and the functionality of the whole water system in Padua.
Among the many actions taken, we can mention the following most important ones:
the drill of new wells in the area of Vicenza;
the duplication of some parts of the water conveyors bringing the water in the 900 mm (3') Conveyance;
the discovery of underground water layers in the area of Brentelle di Sopra (near Padua), the realization of pertinent works and a new drinkable water transportation system, thanks to the new aqueduct of the town of Anconeta (Vicenza);
the contemporary realization of a new huge reservoir, the new central aqueducts in the area of Brentelle, Montà and Stanga;
the reinforcement of the main water conveyors;
the substitution of the old steel distribution pipes with some new ones made in the same material but covered with fibro-concrete, in order to avoid the corrosion caused by electro-chemical agents.
the automation of the receiving, accumulation, elevation and distribution systems.

Padua aqueduct contributed to solve the problems related to water supply of some smaller distribution authorities. 
The following are the most significant data concerning the aqueduct management:

water supply ... 45,000,000m3/per year (9,900 million gallons),
maximum output volume ... 148,000m3/per year (32.5 million gallons),
number users served ...92,000,
length of pipes ... ,
number of employees ... 245.

Water quality
The water arrives to the receiving system after undergoing a long natural conditioning process in the deeper layers. The most varied rock fragments melt and shed their salts into the water, mineralising it. Therefore, Padua waters are classified as “medium-mineral” waters. The AMAG company has been dealing with the disinfection treatment of the waters introduced into the pipes since its start.

Despite concerns in the 21st century about water quality; however the water is tested and drinkable according to legal standards, so much so that the administration is currently planning to build some cleaning up systems to keep the water within optimum quality standards.

Rotunda Padua
Buildings and structures in Padua
Monuments and memorials in Padua